The 2005–06 season was ACF Fiorentina's 80th season in its history and its 68th season in Serie A. The club had its best season on the pitch since the 1998–99 season, originally finishing 4th with 74 points and securing a spot in the qualifying round of the 2006–07 UEFA Champions League. However, the club was punished with a 30-point penalty for its involvement in the 2006 Italian football scandal, resulting in Fiorentina being pushed down the table to 9th. This was a much better outcome than its original punishment, as La Viola were originally relegated to Serie B. Following a successful appeal, Fiorentina was admitted to play in Serie A the following season, albeit losing its Champions League slot and having to start the season with a 15-point penalty, removing any chance of mounting a genuine title challenge and building on the success of the 2005–06 season.

The most significant player during the season was new striker Luca Toni, signed from Palermo in the summer, who netted almost one goal per match on average over the full season, winning the topscoring battle of Serie A with 31 strikes, which was a near-record. New goalkeeper Sébastien Frey was also impressive, conceding 41 goals only due to a weak defence.

Players

Goalkeepers
  Sébastien Frey
  Sebastián Cejas
  Marco Roccati
  Bogdan Lobonț
  Niccolò Manfredini
  Gianluca Berti

Defenders
  Per Krøldrup
  Dario Dainelli
  Alessandro Gamberini
  Christian Maggio
  Davide Brivio
  Tomáš Ujfaluši
  Manuel Pasqual
  Giuseppe Pancaro
  Marco Di Loreto

Midfielders
  Marco Donadel
  Andrea Paolucci
  Stefano Fiore
  Michele Pazienza
  Riccardo Montolivo
  Luis Jiménez
  Martin Jørgensen
  Matthieu Bochu
  Danilo D'Ambrosio
  Gianni Guigou
  Andrea De Falco
  Cristian Brocchi

Forwards
  Valeri Bojinov
  Samuel Di Carmine
  Zisis Vryzas
  Giampaolo Pazzini
  Luca Toni
  Enrico Fantini

Competitions

Overall

Last updated: 14 May 2006

Serie A

League table

Results summary

Results by round

Matches

Coppa Italia

First round

Second round

Third round

Round of 16

References

ACF Fiorentina seasons
Fiorentina